Andorra, officially the Principality of Andorra, is a sovereign landlocked microstate on the Iberian Peninsula, in the eastern Pyrenees, bordered by France to the north and Spain to the south. Believed to have been created by Charlemagne, Andorra was ruled by the count of Urgell until 988, when it was transferred to the Roman Catholic Diocese of Urgell. The present principality was formed by a charter in 1278. It is headed by two co-princes: the bishop of Urgell in Catalonia, Spain and the president of France. Its capital and largest city is Andorra la Vella.

The Andorran people are a Romance ethnic group of originally Catalan descent. Andorra is the world's 16th-smallest country by land and 11th-smallest by population. The official language is Catalan, but Spanish, Portuguese, and French are also commonly spoken.

Tourism in Andorra brings an estimated 10.2 million visitors to the country annually. Andorra is not a member state of the European Union. It has been a member of the United Nations since 1993.

Etymology
The origin of the word Andorra is unknown, although several hypotheses have been proposed. The oldest is one put forward by the Greek historian Polybius (The Histories III, 35, 1), who describes the Andosins, an Iberian Pre-Roman tribe, as historically located in the valleys of Andorra and facing the Carthaginian army in its passage through the Pyrenees during the Punic Wars. The word Andosini or Andosins may derive from the Basque , meaning "big" or "giant". The Andorran toponymy shows evidence of Basque language in the area. Another theory suggests that the word Andorra may derive from the old word Anorra that contains the Basque word  ("water").

Another theory suggests that Andorra may derive from Arabic , indicating a vast land which is located among mountains or a thickly wooded place (with  being the definite article). When the Arabs and Moors conquered the Iberian Peninsula, the valleys of the High Pyrenees were covered by large tracts of forest. These regions were not administered by Muslims, because of the geographic difficulty of direct rule.

Other theories suggest that the term derives from the Navarro-Aragonese "andurrial", which means "land covered with bushes" or "scrubland".

The folk etymology holds that Charlemagne had named the region as a reference to the Biblical Canaanite valley of Endor or Andor (where the Midianites had been defeated), a name bestowed by his heir and son Louis the Pious after defeating the Moors in the "wild valleys of Hell".

History

Prehistory 

La Balma de la Margineda, found by archaeologists at Sant Julià de Lòria, was settled in 9,500 BCE as a passing place between the two sides of the Pyrenees. The seasonal camp was perfectly located for hunting and fishing by the groups of hunter-gatherers from Ariege and Segre.

During the Neolithic Age, a group of people moved to the Valley of Madriu (the present-day Natural Park located in Escaldes-Engordany declared UNESCO World Heritage Site) as a permanent camp in 6640 BCE. The population of the valley grew cereals, raised domestic livestock, and developed a commercial trade with people from the Segre and Occitania.

Other archaeological deposits include the Tombs of Segudet (Ordino) and Feixa del Moro (Sant Julià de Lòria), both dated in 4900–4300 BCE as an example of the Urn culture in Andorra. The model of small settlements began to evolve to a complex urbanism during the Bronze Age. Metallurgical items of iron, ancient coins, and relicaries can be found in the ancient sanctuaries scattered around the country.

The sanctuary of Roc de les Bruixes (Stone of the Witches) is perhaps the most important archeological complex of this age in Andorra, located in the parish of Canillo, about the rituals of funerals, ancient scripture and engraved stone murals.

Iberian and Roman Andorra

The inhabitants of the valleys were traditionally associated with the Iberians and historically located in Andorra as the Iberian tribe Andosins or Andosini during the 7th and 2nd centuries BC. Influenced by the Aquitanian, Basque and Iberian languages, the locals developed some current toponyms. Early writings and documents relating to this group of people goes back to the second century BC by the Greek writer Polybius in his Histories during the Punic Wars.

Some of the most significant remains of this era are the Castle of the Roc d'Enclar (part of the early Marca Hispanica), l'Anxiu in Les Escaldes and Roc de L'Oral in Encamp.

The presence of Roman influence is recorded from the 2nd century BCE to the 5th century CE. The places with the most Roman presence are in Camp Vermell (Red Field) in Sant Julià de Lòria, and in some places in Encamp, as well as in the Roc d'Enclar. People continued trading, mainly with wine and cereals, with the Roman cities of Urgellet (the present-day La Seu d'Urgell) and all across Segre through the via romana Strata Ceretana (also known as Strata Confluetana).

Visigoths and Carolingians: the legend of Charlemagne

After the fall of the Roman Empire, Andorra came under the influence of the Visigoths, the Kingdom of Toledo, and the Diocese of Urgell. The Visigoths remained in the valleys for 200 years, during which time Christianity spread. When the Muslim Empire of Al-Andalus replaced the ruling Visigoths in most of the Iberian Peninsula, Andorra was sheltered from these Arab invaders by the Franks.

Tradition holds that Charles the Great (Charlemagne) granted a charter to the Andorran people for a contingent of 5,000 soldiers under the command of Marc Almugaver, in return for fighting against the Moors near Porté-Puymorens (Cerdanya).

Andorra remained part of the Frankish Marca Hispanica, the buffer zone between the Frankish Empire and the Muslim territories, Andorra being part of the territory ruled by the Count of Urgell and eventually the bishop of the Diocese of Urgell. Tradition also holds that it was guaranteed by the son of Charlemagne, Louis the Pious, writing the Carta de Poblament or a local municipal charter circa 805.

In 988, Count Borrell II of Urgell gave the Andorran valleys to the Diocese of Urgell in exchange for land in Cerdanya. Since then, the bishop of Urgell, based in Seu d'Urgell, has been co-prince of Andorra.

The first document that mentions Andorra as a territory is the Acta de Consagració i Dotació de la Catedral de la Seu d'Urgell (Deed of Consecration and Endowment of the Cathedral of La Seu d'Urgell). The document, dated 839, depicts the six old parishes of the Andorran valleys that made up the country's administrative division.

Medieval Age: The Paréages and the founding of the Co-Principality

Before 1095, Andorra had no military protection, and the bishop of Urgell, who knew that the count of Urgell wanted to reclaim the Andorran valleys, asked the Lord of Caboet for help and protection. In 1095, the lord of Caboet and the bishop of Urgell signed under oath a declaration of their co-sovereignty over Andorra. Arnalda de Caboet, daughter of Arnau of Caboet, married the viscount of Castellbò. Their daughter, Ermessenda de Castellbò, married the count of Foix, Roger-Bernard II. Roger-Bernard II and Ermessenda shared rule over Andorra with the bishop of Urgell.

In the 13th century, a military dispute arose between the bishop of Urgell and the count of Foix as aftermath of the Cathar Crusade. The conflict was resolved in 1278 with the mediation of the king of Aragon, Peter III, between the bishop and the count, by the signing of the first paréage, which provided that Andorra's sovereignty be shared between the count of Foix (whose title would ultimately transfer to the French head of state) and the bishop of Urgell, in Catalonia. This gave the principality its territory and political form.

A second paréage was signed in 1288 after a dispute when the count of Foix ordered the construction of a castle in Roc d'Enclar. The document was ratified by the noble notary Jaume Orig of Puigcerdà, and construction of military structures in the country was prohibited.

In 1364, the political organization of the country named the figure of the syndic (now spokesman and president of the parliament) as representative of the Andorrans to their co-princes, making possible the creation of local departments (comuns, quarts and veïnats). After being ratified by Bishop Francesc Tovia and Count John I, the Consell de la Terra or Consell General de les Valls (General Council of the Valleys) was founded in 1419, the second oldest parliament in Europe. The syndic Andreu d'Alàs and the General Council organized the creation of the Justice Courts (La Cort de Justicia) in 1433 with the co-princes and the collection of taxes like foc i lloc (literally "fire and site", a national tax active since then).

Although there are remains of ecclesiastical works dating before the 9th century (Sant Vicenç d'Enclar or Església de Santa Coloma), Andorra developed exquisite Romanesque Art during the 9th through 14th centuries, particularly in the construction of churches, bridges, religious murals and statues of the Virgin and Child (Our Lady of Meritxell being the most important). Nowadays, the Romanesque buildings that form part of Andorra's cultural heritage stand out in a remarkable way, with an emphasis on Església de Sant Esteve, Sant Joan de Caselles, Església de Sant Miquel d'Engolasters, Sant Martí de la Cortinada and the medieval bridges of Margineda and Escalls among many others.

The Catalan Pyrenees were embryonic of the Catalan language at the end of the 11th century. Andorra was influenced by this language, which was adopted locally decades before it expanded to the rest of the Crown of Aragon.

The local economy during the Middle Ages was based on livestock, agriculture, furs and weavers. Later, at the end of the 11th century, the first iron foundries began to appear in Northern Parishes like Ordino, much appreciated by the master artisans who developed the art of the forges, an important economic activity in the country from the 15th century.

16th to 18th centuries

In 1601 the Tribunal de Corts (High Court of Justice) was created as a result of Huguenot rebellions in France, Inquisition courts coming from Spain and witchcraft-related beliefs native to the area, in the context of the Reformation and Counter-Reformation.

With the passage of time, the co-title to Andorra passed to the kings of Navarre. After Henry III of Navarre became king of France, he issued an edict in 1607 that established the head of the French state and the bishop of Urgell as co-princes of Andorra, a political arrangement that still holds.

During 1617, communal councils form the sometent (popular militia or army) to deal with the rise of bandolerisme (brigandage) and the Consell de la Terra was defined and structured in terms of its composition, organization and competences current today.

Andorra continued with the same economic system that it had during the 12th–14th centuries with a large production of metallurgy (fargues, a system similar to Farga Catalana) and with the introduction of tobacco circa 1692 and import trade. In 1371 and 1448, the co-princes ratified the fair of Andorra la Vella, the most important annual national festival commercially ever since.

The country had a unique and experienced guild of weavers, Confraria de Paraires i Teixidors, in Escaldes-Engordany. Founded in 1604, it took advantage of the local thermal waters. By this time, the country was characterized by the social system of prohoms (wealthy society) and casalers (rest of the population with smaller economic acquisition), deriving from the tradition of pubilla and hereu.

Three centuries after its foundation, the Consell de la Terra located its headquarters and the Tribunal de Corts in Casa de la Vall in 1702. The manor house built in 1580 served as a noble fortress of the Busquets family. Inside the parliament was placed the Closet of the six keys (Armari de les sis claus), representative of each Andorran parish, where the Andorran constitution and other documents and laws were later kept.

In both the Reapers' War and the War of the Spanish Succession, the Andorran people (while professing to be a neutral country) supported the Catalans who saw their rights reduced in 1716. The reaction was the promotion of Catalan writings in Andorra, with cultural works such as the Book of Privileges (Llibre de Privilegis de 1674), Manual Digest (1748) by Antoni Fiter i Rossell or the Polità andorrà (1763) by Antoni Puig.

19th century: the New Reform and the Andorran Question

After the French Revolution, Napoleon I reestablished the Co-Principate in 1809 and removed the French medieval title. In 1812–1813, the First French Empire annexed Catalonia during the Peninsular War and divided the region into four départements, with Andorra as a part of the district of Puigcerdà. In 1814, an imperial decree reestablished the independence and economy of Andorra.

During this period, Andorra's late medieval institutions and rural culture remained largely unchanged. In 1866, the syndic Guillem d'Areny-Plandolit led the reformist group in a Council General of 24 members elected by suffrage limited to heads of families. The Council General replaced the aristocratic oligarchy that previously ruled the state.

The New Reform began after ratification by both Co-Princes and established the basis of the constitution and symbolssuch as the tricolour flagof Andorra. A new service economy arose as a demand of the valley inhabitants and began to build infrastructure such as hotels, spa resorts, roads and telegraph lines.

The authorities of the Co-Princes banned casinos and betting houses throughout the country. The ban resulted in an economic conflict and the Revolution of 1881, which began when revolutionaries assaulted the house of the syndic on 8 December 1880, and established the Provisional Revolutionary Council led by Joan Pla i Calvo and Pere Baró i Mas. The Provisional Revolutionary Council allowed for the construction of casinos and spas by foreign companies. From 7 to 9 June 1881, the loyalists of Canillo and Encamp reconquered the parishes of Ordino and La Massana by establishing contact with the revolutionary forces in Escaldes-Engordany. After a day of combat the Treaty of the Bridge of Escalls was signed on 10 June. The council was replaced and new elections were held. The economic situation worsened, as the populace was divided over the  – the "Andorran Question" in relation to the Eastern Question. The struggles continued between pro-bishops, pro-French, and nationalists based on the troubles of Canillo in 1882 and 1885.

Andorra participated in the cultural movement of the Catalan Renaixença. Between 1882 and 1887, the first academic schools were formed where trilingualism coexisted with the official language, Catalan. Romantic authors from France and Spain reported the awakening of the national consciousness of the country. Jacint Verdaguer lived in Ordino during the 1880s where he wrote and shared works related to the Renaixença with writer and photographer, Joaquim de Riba.

In 1848, Fromental Halévy had premiered the opera Le Val d'Andorre to great success in Europe, where the national consciousness of the valleys was exposed in the romantic work during the Peninsular War.

20th and 21st century: Modernisation of the country and the Constitutional Andorra

In 1933 France occupied Andorra following social unrest which occurred before elections due to the Revolution of 1933 and the FHASA strikes (Vagues de FHASA); the revolt led by Joves Andorrans (a labour union group related to the Spanish CNT and FAI) called for political reforms, the universal suffrage vote of all Andorrans and acted in defense of the rights of local and foreign workers during the construction of FHASA's hydroelectric power station in Encamp. On 5 April 1933 Joves Andorrans seized the Andorran Parliament. These actions were preceded by the arrival of Colonel René-Jules Baulard with 50 gendarmes and the mobilization of 200 local militias or sometent led by the Síndic Francesc Cairat.

On 6 July 1934, adventurer and nobleman Boris Skossyreff, with his promise of freedoms and modernization of the country and wealth through the establishment of a tax haven and foreign investments, received the support of the members of the General Council to proclaim himself the sovereign of Andorra. On 8 July 1934 Boris issued a proclamation in Urgell, declaring himself Boris I, King of Andorra, simultaneously declaring war on the Bishop of Urgell and approving the King's constitution on 10 July. He was arrested by the Co-Prince and Bishop Justí Guitart i Vilardebó and their authorities on 20 July and ultimately expelled from Spain. From 1936 until 1940, a French military detachment of Garde Mobile led by well-known Colonel René-Jules Baulard was garrisoned in Andorra to secure the principality against disruption from the Spanish Civil War and Francoist Spain and also face the rise of Republicanism in the aftermath of the 1933 Revolution. During the Spanish Civil War, the inhabitants of Andorra welcomed refugees from both sides, and many of them settled permanently in the country thus contributing to the subsequent economic boom and the entry into the capitalist era of Andorra. Francoist troops reached the Andorran border in the later stages of the war.

During World War II, Andorra remained neutral and was an important smuggling route between Vichy France and Francoist Spain, two fascist states. Many Andorrans criticized the passivity of the General Council for impeding both the entry and expulsion of foreigners and refugees, committing economic crimes, reducing the rights of citizens and sympathy with Francoism. General Council members justified the council's political and diplomatic actions as necessary for Andorra's survival and the protection of its sovereignty. Andorra was relatively unscathed by the two world wars and the Spanish Civil War. Certain groups formed to help victims of oppression in Nazi-occupied countries, while participating in smuggling to help Andorra survive. Among the most prominent was the Hostal Palanques Evasion Network Command, which, in contact with the British Mi6, helped almost 400 fugitives, among whom were Allied military personnel. The Command remained active between 1941 and 1944, although there were struggles with pro-Axis informers and Gestapo agents in Andorra.

In the capital city there was a smuggling black market of propaganda, culture and cinematic art not favorable to totalitarian regimes, promulgated in such places as the Hotel Mirador or the Casino Hotel, as a meeting place for Free French forces and a route for escorting crashed Allied pilots out of Europe. The network was maintained after the war, when film societies were formed, where movies, music and books censored in Franco's Spain were imported, becoming an anti-censorship attraction for the Catalan or foreign public even within Andorra. Andorran Group (Agrupament Andorrà), an anti-fascist organization linked to the Occitanie's French Resistance, accused the French representative (veguer) of collaboration with Nazism.

The Andorran opening to the capitalist economy resulted in two axes: mass tourism and the country's tax exemption. The first steps toward the capitalist boom date from the 1930s, with the construction of FHASA and the creation of professional banking with Banc Agrícol (1930) and Crèdit Andorrà (1949), later with Banca Mora (1952), Banca Cassany (1958) and SOBANCA (1960). Shortly after activities such as skiing and shopping become a tourist attraction, with the inauguration of ski resorts and cultural entities in the late 1930s. All in all, a renovated hotel industry has developed. In April 1968 a social health insurance system was created (CASS).

The Andorran government necessarily involved planning, projection and forecasts for the future: with the official visit of the French co-prince Charles de Gaulle in 1967 and 1969, it was given approval for the economic boom and national demands within the framework of human rights and international openness.

Andorra lived an era commonly known as "Andorran dream" (in relation to the American dream) along with the Trente Glorieuses: the mass culture rooted the country experiencing radical changes in the economy and culture. Proof of this was Ràdio Andorra, the top musical radio station in Europe in this period, with guests and speakers of great importance promoting musical hits of chanson française, swing, rhythm & blues, jazz, rock and roll and American country music. During this period Andorra achieved a GDP per capita and a life expectancy higher than the most standard countries of the current economy.

Given its relative isolation, Andorra has existed outside the mainstream of European history, with few ties to countries other than France, Spain and Portugal. But in recent times its thriving tourist industry along with developments in transport and communications have removed the country from its isolation. Since 1976 the country has seen the need to reform Andorran institutions due to anachronisms in sovereignty, human rights and the balance of powers as well as the need to adapt legislation to modern demands. In 1982 a first separation of powers took place when instituting the Govern d'Andorra, under the name of Executive Board (Consell Executiu), chaired by the first prime minister Òscar Ribas Reig with the co-princes' approval. In 1989 the Principality signed an agreement with the European Economic Community to regularize trade relations.

Its political system was modernized in 1993 after the Andorran constitutional referendum, when the constitution was drafted by the co-princes and the General Council and approved on 14 March by 74.2% of voters, with a 76% turnout. The first elections under the new constitution were held later in the year. The same year, Andorra became a member of the United Nations and the Council of Europe.

Andorra formalized diplomatic relations with the United States in 1996, participating in the 51st UN General Assembly. First General Syndic Marc Forné took part on a speech in Catalan in the General Assembly to defend the reform of the organization, and after three days he took part in the parliamentary assembly of the Council of Europe to defend Andorra's linguistic rights and economy. In 2006 a monetary agreement with the European Union was formalized that allows Andorra to use the euro in an official way, as well as coin its own euro currency.

Politics

Andorra is a parliamentary co-principality with the Bishop of Urgell and the president of France as co-princes. This peculiarity makes the president of France, in his capacity as prince of Andorra, an elected monarch, although he is not elected by a popular vote of the Andorran people. The politics of Andorra take place in a framework of a parliamentary representative democracy with a unicameral legislature, and of a pluriform multi-party system. The prime minister is the chief executive.

The current Prime Minister is Xavier Espot Zamora of the Democrats for Andorra (DA). Executive power is exercised by the government. Legislative power is vested in both government and parliament.

The Parliament of Andorra is known as the General Council. The General Council consists of between 28 and 42 councillors. The councillors serve for four-year terms, and elections are held between the 30th and 40th days following the dissolution of the previous Council.

Half are elected in equal numbers by each of the seven administrative parishes, and the other half of the councillors are elected in a single national constituency. Fifteen days after the election, the councillors hold their inauguration. During this session, the General Syndic, who is the head of the General Council, and the Subsyndic General, his assistant, are elected. Eight days later, the Council convenes once more. During this session, the prime minister is chosen from among the councillors.

Candidates can be proposed by a minimum of one-fifth of the councillors. The Council then elects the candidate with the absolute majority of votes to be prime minister. The Syndic General then notifies the co-princes, who in turn appoint the elected candidate as the prime minister of Andorra. The General Council is also responsible for proposing and passing laws. Bills may be presented to the council as Private Members' Bills by three of the local Parish Councils jointly or by at least one tenth of the citizens of Andorra.

The council also approves the annual budget of the principality. The government must submit the proposed budget for parliamentary approval at least two months before the previous budget expires. If the budget is not approved by the first day of the next year, the previous budget is extended until a new one is approved. Once any bill is approved, the Syndic General is responsible for presenting it to the co-princes so that they may sign and enact it.

If the prime minister is not satisfied with the council, he may request that the co-princes dissolve the council and order new elections. In turn, the councillors have the power to remove the prime minister from office. After a motion of censure is approved by at least one-fifth of the councillors, the council will vote and if it receives the absolute majority of votes, the prime minister is removed.

Law and criminal justice

The judiciary is composed of the Magistrates Court, the Criminal Law Court, the High Court of Andorra, and the Constitutional Court. The High Court of Justice is composed of five judges: one appointed by the prime minister, one each by the co-princes, one by the Syndic General, and one by the judges and magistrates. It is presided over by the member appointed by the Syndic General and the judges hold office for six-year terms.

The magistrates and judges are appointed by the High Court, as is the president of the Criminal Law Court. The High Court also appoints members of the Office of the Attorney General. The Constitutional Court is responsible for interpreting the Constitution and reviewing all appeals of unconstitutionality against laws and treaties. It is composed of four judges, one appointed by each of the co-princes and two by the General Council. They serve eight-year terms. The Court is presided over by one of the judges on a two-year rotation so that each judge at one point will preside over the Court.

Foreign relations, defence and security

Andorra does not have its own armed forces, although there is a small ceremonial army. Responsibility for defending the nation rests primarily with France and Spain. However, in case of emergencies or natural disasters, the Sometent (an alarm) is called and all able-bodied men between 21 and 60 of Andorran nationality must serve. This is why all Andorrans, and especially the head of each house (usually the eldest able-bodied man of a house) should, by law, keep a rifle, even though the law also states that the police will offer a firearm in case of need. Andorra is a full member of the United Nations (UN), the Organization for Security and Co-operation in Europe (OSCE), and has a special agreement with the European Union (EU), it also has observer status at the World Trade Organization (WTO). On 16 October 2020, Andorra became the 190th member of the International Monetary Fund (IMF), during the COVID-19 pandemic.

Military
Andorra has a small army, which has historically been raised or reconstituted at various dates, but has never in modern times amounted to a standing army. The basic principle of Andorran defence is that all able-bodied men are available to fight if called upon by the summoning of the Sometent (a civil defense organization of Andorra, made up of the heads of households). Being a landlocked country, Andorra has no navy.

Before World War I, Andorra maintained an armed militia force of about 600 part-time militiamen under the supervision of a Captain (Capità or Cap de Sometent) and a Lieutenant (Desener or Lloctinent del Capità). This body was not liable for service outside the principality and was commanded by two officials (veguers) appointed by France and the Bishop of Urgell.

In the modern era, the army has consisted of a very small body of volunteers willing to undertake ceremonial duties. Uniforms and weaponry were handed down from generation to generation within families and communities.

The army's role in internal security was largely taken over by the formation of the Police Corps of Andorra in 1931. Brief civil disorder associated with the elections of 1933 led to assistance being sought from the French National Gendarmerie, with a detachment resident in Andorra for two months under the command of René-Jules Baulard. The Andorran Police was reformed in the following year, with eleven soldiers appointed to supervisory roles. The force consisted of six Corporals, one for each parish (although there are currently seven parishes, there were only six until 1978), plus four junior staff officers to co-ordinate action, and a commander with the rank of major. It was the responsibility of the six corporals, each in his own parish, to be able to raise a fighting force from among the able-bodied men of the parish.

The only permanent section of the present-day Sometent is a twelve-man ceremonial unit. However, all able-bodied men are technically available for military service, with a requirement for each family to have access to a firearm. An area weapon such as a Shotgun per household is unregulated, however ranged weapons such as Pistols and Rifles require a license. The army has not fought for more than 700 years, and its main responsibility is to present the flag of Andorra at official ceremonial functions. According to Marc Forné Molné, Andorra's military budget is strictly from voluntary donations, and the availability of full-time volunteers.

In more recent times there has only been a general emergency call to the popular army of Sometent during the floods of 1982 in the Catalan Pyrenees, where 12 citizens perished in Andorra, to help the population and establish a public order along with the Local Police units.

Police Corps

Andorra maintains a small but modern and well-equipped internal police force, with around 240 police officers supported by civilian assistants. The principal services supplied by the corps are uniformed community policing, criminal detection, border control, and traffic policing. There are also small specialist units including police dogs, mountain rescue, and a bomb disposal team.

GIPA
The Grup d'Intervenció Policia d'Andorra (GIPA) is a small special forces squad trained in counter-terrorism, and hostage recovery tasks. Although it is the closest in style to an active military force, it is part of the Police Corps, and not the army. As terrorist and hostage situations are a rare threat to the country, the GIPA is commonly assigned to prisoner escort duties, and at other times to routine policing.

Fire brigade
The Andorran Fire Brigade, with headquarters at Santa Coloma, operates from four modern fire stations, and has a staff of around 120 firefighters. The service is equipped with 16 heavy appliances (fire tenders, turntable ladders, and specialist four-wheel drive vehicles), four light support vehicles (cars and vans) and four ambulances.

Historically, the families of the six ancient parishes of Andorra maintained local arrangements to assist each other in fighting fires. The first fire pump purchased by the government was acquired in 1943. Serious fires which lasted for two days in December 1959 led to calls for a permanent fire service, and the Andorran Fire Brigade was formed on 21 April 1961.

The fire service maintains full-time cover with five fire crews on duty at any time: two at the brigade's headquarters in Santa Coloma, and one crew at each of the other three fire stations.

Geography

Parishes

Andorra consists of seven parishes:
  Andorra la Vella
  Canillo
  Encamp
  Escaldes-Engordany
  La Massana
  Ordino
  Sant Julià de Lòria

Physical geography
These are dissected by three narrow valleys in a Y shape that combine into one as the main stream, the Gran Valira river, leaves the country for Spain (at Andorra's lowest point of ).

Environment
Phytogeographically, Andorra belongs to the Atlantic European province of the Circumboreal Region within the Boreal Kingdom. According to the WWF, the territory of Andorra belongs to the ecoregion of Pyrenees conifer and mixed forests. Andorra had a 2018 Forest Landscape Integrity Index mean score of 4.45/10, ranking it 127th globally out of 172 countries.

Important Bird Area
The whole country has been recognised as a single Important Bird Area (IBA) by BirdLife International, because it is important for forest and mountain birds and supports populations of red-billed choughs, citril finches and rock buntings.

Climate

Andorra has alpine, continental and oceanic climates, depending on altitude. Its higher elevation means there is, on average, more snow in winter and it is slightly cooler in summer. The diversity of landmarks, the different orientation of the valleys and the irregularity relief typical of the Mediterranean climates make the country have a great diversity of microclimates that hinder the general dominance of the high mountain climate. The great differences of altitude in the minimum and maximum points, together with the influence of a Mediterranean climate, develop the climate of the Andorran Pyrenees.

When in precipitation, a global model characterized by convective and abundant rains can be defined during spring and summer, which can last until autumn (May, June and August are usually the rainiest months). In winter, however, it is less rainy, except in the highlands, subject to the influence of fronts from the Atlantic, which explains the great amount of snowfall in the Andorran mountains. The temperature regime is characterized, broadly, by a temperate summer and a long and cold winter, in accordance with the mountainous condition of the Principality.

Economy

Tourism, the mainstay of Andorra's tiny, well-to-do economy, accounts for roughly 80% of GDP. An estimated 10.2 million tourists visit annually, attracted by Andorra's duty-free status and by its summer and winter resorts.

The sport brings in over 7 million visitors annually and an estimated 340 million euros per year, sustaining 2,000 direct and 10,000 indirect jobs at present since 2007.

The banking sector, with its tax haven status, also contributes substantially to the economy with revenues raised exclusively through import tariffs (the financial and insurance sector accounts for approximately 19% of GDP). However, during the European sovereign-debt crisis of the 21st century, the tourist industry suffered a decline, partly caused by a drop in the prices of goods in Spain, undercutting duty-free shopping and increasing unemployment. On 1 January 2012, a business tax of 10% was introduced, followed by a sales tax of 2% a year later, which raised just over 14 million euros in its first quarter.

Agricultural production is limited; only 1.7% of the land is arable, and most food has to be imported. Some tobacco is grown locally. The principal livestock activity is domestic sheep raising. Manufacturing output consists mainly of cigarettes, cigars, and furniture. Andorra's natural resources include hydroelectric power, mineral water, timber, iron ore, and lead.

Andorra is not a member of the European Union, but enjoys a special relationship with it, such as being treated as an EU member for trade in manufactured goods (no tariffs) and as a non-EU member for agricultural products. Andorra lacked a currency of its own and used both the French franc and the Spanish peseta in banking transactions until 31 December 1999, when both currencies were replaced by the EU's single currency, the euro. Coins and notes of both the franc and the peseta remained legal tender in Andorra until 31 December 2002. Andorra negotiated to issue its own euro coins, beginning in 2014.

Andorra has historically had one of the world's lowest unemployment rates. In 2019 it stood at 2%.

On 31 May 2013, it was announced that Andorra intended to legislate for the introduction of an income tax by the end of June, against a background of increasing dissatisfaction with the existence of tax havens among EU members. The announcement was made following a meeting in Paris between the Prime Minister Antoni Martí and the French President and Prince of Andorra François Hollande. Hollande welcomed the move as part of a process of Andorra "bringing its taxation in line with international standards".

By the mid-2010s, the financial system comprised five banking groups, one specialised credit entity, eight investment undertaking management entities, three asset management companies, and 29 insurance companies, 14 of which are branches of foreign insurance companies authorised to operate in the principality. The last mergers between banks took place in 2022, bringing the Andorran financial sector to currently have 3 active banking groups.

Demographics

Population

The Andorrans are a Romance ethnic group of originally Catalan descent. The population has grown from 5,000 in 1900.

Two-thirds of residents lack Andorran nationality and do not have the right to vote in communal elections. Moreover, they are not allowed to be elected as prime minister or to own more than 33% of the capital stock of a privately held company.

Languages

According to mother tongue percentage statistics by the Andorran Government released in 2018 :

The historic and official language is Catalan, a Romance language. The Andorran government encourages the use of Catalan. It funds a Commission for Catalan Toponymy in Andorra, and provides free Catalan classes to assist immigrants. Andorran television and radio stations use Catalan.

Because of immigration, historical links, and close geographic proximity, Spanish, Portuguese and French are commonly spoken. Most Andorran residents can speak one or more of these, in addition to Catalan. English is less commonly spoken among the general population, though it is understood to varying degrees in the major tourist resorts. Andorra is one of only four European countries (together with France, Monaco, and Turkey) that have never signed the Council of Europe Framework Convention on National Minorities.

Religion
 
The population of Andorra is predominantly (88.2%) Catholic. Their patron saint is Our Lady of Meritxell. There are also members of various Protestant denominations. There are also small numbers of Muslims, Hindus, and Bahá'ís, and roughly 100 Jews. (See History of the Jews in Andorra.)

Largest cities

Education

Schools
Children between the ages of 6 and 16 are required by law to have full-time education. Education up to secondary level is provided free of charge by the government.

There are three systems of school, Andorran, French and Spanish, which use Catalan, French and Spanish languages respectively, as the main language of instruction. Parents may choose which system their children attend. All schools are built and maintained by Andorran authorities, but teachers in the French and Spanish schools are paid for the most part by France and Spain. 39% of Andorran children attend Andorran schools, 33% attend French schools, and 28% Spanish schools.

University of Andorra
The Universitat d'Andorra (UdA) is the state public university and is the only university in Andorra. It was established in 1997. The university provides first-level degrees in nursing, computer science, business administration, and educational sciences, in addition to higher professional education courses. The only two graduate schools in Andorra are the Nursing School and the School of Computer Science, the latter having a PhD programme.

Virtual Studies Centre
The geographical complexity of the country as well as the small number of students prevents the University of Andorra from developing a full academic programme, and it serves principally as a centre for virtual studies, connected to Spanish and French universities. The Virtual Studies Centre (Centre d'Estudis Virtuals) at the university runs approximately 20 different academic degrees at both undergraduate and postgraduate levels in fields including tourism, law, Catalan philology, humanities, psychology, political sciences, audiovisual communication, telecommunications engineering, and East Asia studies. The centre also runs various postgraduate programmes and continuing-education courses for professionals.

Transport

Until the 20th century, Andorra had very limited transport links to the outside world, and development of the country was affected by its physical isolation. Even now, the nearest major airports at Toulouse and Barcelona are both three hours' drive from Andorra.

The two main roads out of Andorra la Vella are the CG-1 to the Spanish border near Sant Julià de Lòria, and the CG-2 to the French border via the Envalira Tunnel near El Pas de la Casa. Bus services cover all metropolitan areas and many rural communities, with services on most major routes running half-hourly or more frequently during peak travel times. There are frequent long-distance bus services from Andorra to Barcelona and Toulouse, plus a daily tour from the former city. Bus services mostly are run by private companies, but some local ones are operated by the government.

Since July 2015, Andorra–La Seu d'Urgell Airport has operated commercial flights to Madrid and Palma de Mallorca, and is the main hub for Air Andorra and Andorra Airlines.

Nearby airports located in Spain and France provide access to international flights for the principality. The nearest airports are at Perpignan, France ( from Andorra) and Lleida, Spain ( from Andorra). The largest nearby airports are at Toulouse, France ( from Andorra) and Barcelona, Spain ( from Andorra). There are hourly bus services from both Barcelona and Toulouse airports to Andorra.

This line is operated by the SNCF. Latour-de-Carol has a scenic  trainline to Villefranche-de-Conflent, as well as the SNCF's  gauge line connecting to Perpignan, and the RENFE's  -gauge line to Barcelona. There are also direct Intercités de Nuit trains between L'Hospitalet-près-l'Andorre and Paris on certain dates.

Media and telecommunications

In Andorra, mobile and fixed telephone and internet services are operated exclusively by the Andorran national telecommunications company, SOM, also known as Andorra Telecom (STA). The same company also manages the technical infrastructure for national broadcasting of digital television and radio. In 2010 Andorra became the first country to provide a direct optical fiber link to all homes (FTTH) and businesses.

The first commercial radio station to broadcast was Radio Andorra, which was active from 1939 to 1981. On 12 October 1989, the General Council established radio and television as essential public services creating and managing the entity ORTA, becoming on 13 April 2000, in the public company Ràdio i Televisió d'Andorra (RTVA). In 1990, the public radio was founded on the Radio Nacional d'Andorra. As an autochthonous television channel, there is only the national public television network Andorra Televisió, created in 1995. Additional TV and radio stations from Spain and France are available via digital terrestrial television and IPTV.

There are three national newspapers, Diari d'Andorra, El Periòdic d'Andorra, and Bondia as well as several local newspapers. The history of the Andorran press begins in the period between 1917 and 1937 with the appearance of several periodicals papers such as Les Valls d'Andorra (1917), Nova Andorra (1932) and Andorra Agrícola (1933). In 1974, the Poble Andorrà became the first regular newspaper in Andorra. There is also an amateur radio society and news agency ANA with independent management.

Culture

Andorra is home to folk dances like the contrapàs and marratxa, which survive in Sant Julià de Lòria especially. Andorran folk music has similarities to the music of its neighbours, but is especially Catalan in character, especially in the presence of dances such as the sardana. Other Andorran folk dances include contrapàs in Andorra la Vella and Saint Anne's dance in Escaldes-Engordany. Andorra's national holiday is Our Lady of Meritxell Day, 8 September.

Among the more important festivals and traditions are the Canólich Gathering in May, the Roser d'Ordino in July, the Meritxell Day (National Day of Andorra), the Andorra la Vella Fair, the Sant Jordi Day, the Santa Llúcia Fair, the Festivity from La Candelera to Canillo, the Carnival of Encamp, the sung of caramelles, the Festivity of Sant Esteve and the Festa del Poble.

Andorra participated regularly in the Eurovision Song Contest between 2004 and 2009, being the only participating country presenting songs in Catalan.

In popular folklore, the best-known Andorran legends are the legend of Charlemagne, according to which this Frankish King would have founded the country, the White Lady of Auvinyà, the Buner d'Ordino, the legend of Engolasters Lake and the legend of Our Lady of Meritxell.

Andorran gastronomy is mainly Catalan, although it has also adopted other elements of French and Italian cuisines. The cuisine of the country has similar characteristics with the neighbours of Cerdanya and Alt Urgell, with whom it has strong cultural ties. Andorra's cuisine is marked by its nature as mountain valleys. Typical dishes of the country are quince all-i-oli, duck with winter pear, roast lamb with nuts, pork civet, massegada cake, escarole with pears, duck confit and mushrooms, escudella, spinach with raisins and pine nuts, jelly marmalade, stuffed murgues (mushrooms) with pork, dandelion salad, and Andorran river trout. To drink, mulled wine and beer are also popular. Some of the dishes are very common in the mountainous regions of Catalonia, such as trinxat, embotits, cooked snails, rice with mushrooms, mountain rice and mató.

Pre-Romanesque and Romanesque art are one of the most important artistic manifestations and characteristics of the Principality. The Romanesque one allows to know the formation of the parochial communities, the relations of (social and political) power and the national culture. There are a total of forty Romanesque churches that stand out as being small austere ornamentation constructions, as well as bridges, fortresses and manor houses of the same period.

Summer solstice fire festivals in the Pyrenees was included as UNESCO Intangible cultural heritage in 2015. Also the Madriu-Perafita-Claror Valley became Andorra's first, and to date its only, UNESCO World Heritage Site in 2004, with a small extension in 2006.

Sports
Andorra is famous for the practice of winter sports. Andorra has the largest territory of ski slopes in the Pyrenees (3100 hectares and about 350 km of slopes) and two ski resorts. Grandvalira is the largest and most popular resort. Other popular sports played in Andorra include football, rugby union, basketball, and roller hockey.

For roller hockey, Andorra usually plays in CERH Euro Cup and in FIRS Roller Hockey World Cup. In 2011, Andorra was the host country to the 2011 European League Final Eight.

The country is represented in association football by the Andorra national football team. The team gained its first competitive win in a European Championship qualifier on 11 October 2019, against Moldova. Football is governed in Andorra by the Andorran Football Federation – founded in 1994, it organizes the national competitions of association football (Primera Divisió, Copa Constitució and Supercopa) and futsal. Andorra was admitted to UEFA and FIFA in the same year, 1996. FC Andorra, a club based in Andorra la Vella founded in 1942, compete in the Spanish football league system.

Rugby is a traditional sport in Andorra, mainly influenced by the popularity in southern France. The Andorra national rugby union team, nicknamed Els Isards, plays on the international stage in rugby union and rugby sevens. VPC Andorra XV is a rugby team based in Andorra la Vella, which actually plays in the French championship.

Basketball popularity has increased in the country since the 1990s, when the Andorran team BC Andorra played in the top league of Spain (Liga ACB). After 18 years the club returned to the top league in 2014.

Other sports practised in Andorra include cycling, volleyball, judo, Australian Rules football, handball, swimming, gymnastics, tennis, and motorsports.

Andorra first participated at the Olympic Games in 1976. The country has appeared in every Winter Olympic Games since 1976. Andorra competes in the Games of the Small States of Europe, being twice the host country, in 1991 and 2005.

As one of the Catalan Countries, Andorra is home to a team of castellers, or Catalan human tower builders.

See also

 Index of Andorra-related articles
 Outline of Andorra
 Bibliography of Andorra

Explanatory notes

Citations

General bibliography

Further reading
 Berthet, Elie, The Valley of Andorra. Bristol, UK: J. W. Arrowsmith, 1886.
 Butler, Michael, Frisch: Andorra.
 Carrick, Noel, Let's Visit Andorra. London: Macmillan, 1988.
 
 Deane, Shirley, The Road to Andorra. London: John Murray, 1960.
 Duursma, John C., Fragmentation and the International Relations of Micro-States. Cambridge University Press, 1996.
 Jenner, Paul & Christine Smith, Landscapes of the Pyrenees. London: Sunflower Books, 1990.
 Johnson, Virginia W., Two Quaint Republics: Andorra and San Marino.
 Leary, Lewis Gaston, Andorra the Hidden Republic. London: T. Fisher Unwin, 1912.
 Mackintosh, May, Assignment in Andorra. London: Pan, 1976.
 Murray, James Erskine, A Summer in the Pyrenees. London: John Macrone, 1837.
 Newman, Bernard, Round About Andorra. London: George Allen & Unwin, 1928.
 Piesold, Werner, Andorra.
 Reichert, Thomas, Andorra: A Country Survey. Nuremberg, 1986.
 Spender, Harold & H. Llewellyn Smith, Through the High Pyrenees. London: A. D. Innes, 1898.
 Vila, Linda Armengol, Approach to the History of Andorra. Perpignan: Institut d'Estudis Andorrans, 1989.
 Vilajoana, Ricard Fiter & M. Marti Rebols, All Andorra. Barcelona: Escudo de Oro, 1979.
 Waagenaar, Sam, The Little Five. London: Andre Deutsch, 1960.

External links

 Govern d'Andorra Official governmental site 
 Andorra. The World Factbook. Central Intelligence Agency.
 Portals to the World from the United States Library of Congress
 Andorra from UCB Libraries GovPubs
 
 Andorra from the BBC News
 Andorra – Guía, turismo y de viajes
 History of Andorra: Primary Documents from EuroDocs
 A New Path for Andorra – slideshow by The New York Times
 
 

 
1278 establishments in Europe
Catalan Countries
Christian states
Countries in Europe
Diarchies
Duty-free zones of Europe
French-speaking countries and territories
Iberian Peninsula countries
Important Bird Areas of Andorra
Landlocked countries
Member states of the Council of Europe
Member states of the Organisation internationale de la Francophonie
Member states of the United Nations
Monarchies of Europe
Prince-bishoprics
Principalities
Pyrenees
Southern European countries
Southwestern European countries
Spanish-speaking countries and territories
Special economic zones
States and territories established in 1278